Wingene (historically: Wynghene) is a municipality located in the Belgian province of West Flanders. The municipality comprises the towns of Wingene proper and Zwevezele. On December 1, 2019, Wingene had a total population of 14,398. The total area is 68.42 km2 which gives a population density of 192 inhabitants per km2.

Gallery

References

External links 

Municipalities of West Flanders